Long Creek Mountain Summit is a mountain pass in Oregon traversed by U.S. Route 395.

Mountain passes of Oregon
Transportation in Grant County, Oregon
Landforms of Grant County, Oregon

References